Limington is a town in York County, Maine, United States. The population was 3,892 at the 2020 census. Limington is a tourist destination with historic architecture. It is part of the Portland–South Portland–Biddeford, Maine metropolitan statistical area.

History

In 1668, Francis Small traded goods with the Newichewannock tribe of this area. Their Chief Wesumbe, also known as Captain Sunday, was friendly with Small and warned him of a plot against his life. A group of renegade tribesmen planned to murder Small rather than pay him the furs they owed him. Small escaped after watching his trading post in what is now Cornish burn to the ground. The chief made up for the loss by selling Small all the lands bounded by the Great and Little Ossipee Rivers, the Saco River and the New Hampshire border. Known as the Ossipee Tract, it comprised the present-day towns of Limington, Limerick, Cornish (formerly Francisborough), Newfield, Parsonsfield and Shapleigh (which then included Acton).

First called Little Ossipee Plantation (after Ossapee, its original Abenaki name), it was settled by Deacon Amos Chase, who removed here and built a mill in 1773 at the mouth of the Little Ossipee River. Ezra Davis and Jonathan Boothby followed him in 1774, and John McArthur and Joshua Small in 1775. Little Ossipee Plantation was incorporated on February 9, 1792 as the town of Limington. It was named after Limington in Somerset, England, the home county of Sir Ferdinando Gorges, Lord Proprietor of Maine.

Soil was fertile and farmers yielded good crops. Another important early trade was logging, with the timber manufactured at various water power mills into lumber, boxes, shingles and clapboards. There were also gristmills and a tannery. Limington Academy was incorporated in 1848, its structure built in 1852. The population in 1870 was 1,630. Davis Memorial Library was built in 1912 to designs of noted Portland architect John Calvin Stevens. Today, 22 buildings in the town center are listed on the National Register of Historic Places.

Geography

Limington is drained by the Little Ossipee River and Saco River. There are 7 ponds, with 4 of these—Boyd, Dole, Foss and Sand ponds—in South Limington, and 3 others—Horn, Ward and Webster ponds—in North Limington.

Limington is crossed by state routes 11, 25 and 117. It borders the towns of Baldwin to the north, Standish to the east, Hollis and Waterboro to the south, and Limerick and Cornish to the west. Located in the very northeastern part of York County, Limington is slightly over nine miles (14 km) long and an average of five miles (8 km) wide.

Demographics

2010 census

As of the census of 2010, there were 3,713 people, 1,392 households, and 1,029 families living in the town. The racial makeup of the town was 96.6% White, 0.2% African American, 0.4% Native American, 0.5% Asian, 0.1% Pacific Islander, 0.3% from other races, and 1.8% from two or more races. Hispanic or Latino of any race were 1.2% of the population.

There were 1,392 households, of which 34.9% had children under the age of 18 living with them, 57.4% were married couples living together, 9.9% had a female householder with no husband present, 6.6% had a male householder with no wife present, and 26.1% were non-families. 18.7% of all households were made up of individuals, and 5.7% had someone living alone who was 65 years of age or older. The average household size was 2.67 and the average family size was 3.04.

The median age in the town was 38.9 years. 24.2% of residents were under the age of 18; 7.1% were between the ages of 18 and 24; 28.1% were from 25 to 44; 31.6% were from 45 to 64; and 9.1% were 65 years of age or older. The gender makeup of the town was 50.0% male and 50.0% female.

2000 census

As of the census of 2000, there were 3,403 people, 1,141 households, and 893 families living in the town. The racial makeup of the town was 98.33% White, 0.41% African American, 0.47% Native American, 0.18% Asian, 0.06% Pacific Islander, 0.12% from other races, and 0.44% from two or more races. Hispanic or Latino of any race were 0.29% of the population.

There were 1,141 households, out of which 41.3% had children under the age of 18 living with them, 64.1% were married couples living together, 9.4% had a female householder with no husband present, and 21.7% were non-families. 15.1% of all households were made up of individuals, and 4.7% had someone living alone who was 65 years of age or older.  The average household size was 2.84 and the average family size was 3.15.

In the town, the population was spread out, with 27.4% under the age of 18, 8.2% from 18 to 24, 30.1% from 25 to 44, 23.3% from 45 to 64, and 11.0% who were 65 years of age or older.  The median age was 37 years. For every 100 females, there were 96.9 males.  For every 100 females age 18 and over, there were 94.4 males.

The median income for a household in the town was $42,023, and the median income for a family was $46,571. Males had a median income of $31,049 versus $23,966 for females. The per capita income for the town was $17,097.  About 9.5% of families and 12.9% of the population were below the poverty line, including 17.0% of those under age 18 and 5.9% of those age 65 or over.

Economy

The Limington Plaza lies in the heart of Limington on route 25 and 11 crossing. The plaza contains Sleeper's Supermarket & Ace Hardware (grocery, deli, pizza, meat market, bakery, produce, liquor, bottle redemption, 24-hour gas), a brand new Citgo Gas Station, Cutting Edge Hair Salon, Wanda Plumbers Dance School & Tangere Massage.  Across the Street from Sleeper's Supermarket a Dollar General opened on July 24.

Brackett Orchards is thought to be the oldest family owned and operated orchard in Maine. The original descendants settled Limington, Maine in 1783, and as soon as the land was cleared, apple trees were planted on a few acres. Manley Brackett is the eighth generation of Brackets which still farms the land growing apples and many varieties of pumpkins and squash.

Notable people 

 Frank S. Black, US congressman; 32nd governor of New York
 Simon Lord, Wisconsin State Senator
 William B. Small, US congressman

References

Further reading

External links
 Town of Limington, Maine
 Davis Memorial Library
 Limington Historical Society
 Centre of Movement School of Performing Arts
 Francis Small Heritage Trust
 Limington Harmon Airport
 Epodunk Town Profile
 Maine Genealogy: Limington, York County, Maine
 The Pequawket Lake Preservation Association – Preserving a Limington Resource
 Brackett Orchards

 
Portland metropolitan area, Maine
Towns in York County, Maine
Towns in Maine